Paul Allen Ebert (August 11, 1932 – April 21, 2009) was a director of the American College of Surgeons and athlete.  He had been Chairman of the Departments of Surgery at both Cornell University Medical College and the University of California San Francisco Medical Center, as well as the President of the American College of Cardiology, the American Association for Thoracic Surgery, the Society of University Surgeons, and the Western Thoracic Surgical Association.  Before earning his medical degree, he was an All-American in both baseball and basketball at the Ohio State University. He was born in Columbus, Ohio.

Athlete
As a student at Ohio State Ebert was 6'4", 188 lbs.  He was a forward and center on the school's basketball team and a pitcher on the baseball team.  He was a charter member of the Ohio State Varsity O Hall of Fame, inducted in 1977.

In basketball Ebert was a first-team All-Big Ten selection and voted team MVP every year he played for the Buckeyes, 1951–52, 1952–53, and 1953–54.  He led his team in scoring in each of those years. He finished his collegiate basketball career with the team record in points scored (1,436), surpassed in 1956 by Robin Freeman.  Ebert scored 516 points in his senior year, becoming the first Ohio State player to score at least 500 points in a season.  That year Ebert served as team captain and was named a third-team All-America selection by the United Press International.

In baseball Ebert had a career 21–8 record as a pitcher.  He led his team in both wins and strike outs every year he played.  He finished his collegiate career with the Ohio State single-season (94) and career (223) record for strike outs, surpassed in both categories by Steve Arlin in the mid-1960s.  Ebert was a consensus first team All America selection as a senior. Ebert was selected to the USA Baseball team that Won Silver at the Pan American Games in Mexico 1955,he went 2–0 and was the pitcher of record with 18 strikeouts.

After college Ebert spent two summers playing semi-pro baseball in Marshall, Minnesota. At the end of the first summer in Marshall he returned to Columbus to be married to Louise Joyce Parks and to begin medical school at Ohio State.  Ebert received offers to sign with the New York Giants and Pittsburgh Pirates, but under the bonus baby rules of the time he would have been required to stay with the major league club for two years and could not have attended medical school.

Surgeon
Ebert received his M.D. degree from Ohio State University in 1958. He had internship and residency at Johns Hopkins Hospital under Alfred Blalock, and then spent two years as a Senior Assistant Surgeon at the National Heart Institute, National Institutes of Health, Bethesda, Maryland. He specialized in thoracic and cardiovascular surgery. He is considered one of the world's outstanding pediatric heart surgeons.

Ebert's stature in his field quickly grew. He became a Professor of Surgery at Duke University Medical Center. From 1971 to 1975 he was Chairman of the Department of Surgery at Cornell University Medical College and from 1975 to 1986 he was Chairman of the Department of Surgery at the University of California San Francisco Medical Center. He was a Fellow of the American College of Surgeons since 1968, and assumed the directorship of the College in November 1986.

Ebert was the 1989 recipient of the Theodore Roosevelt Award, the highest honor the National Collegiate Athletic Association may confer on an individual, awarded to a distinguished citizen of national reputation based on outstanding life accomplishment.

Father
After marrying Louise Joyce Parks, Paul and Joyce went on to have 3 children.  Leslie Ebert Buhlman, Mike Ebert and Julie Ebert-McQuillan. Grandparents to 5 children.  Holly, Rudy, Claire and Paul Buhlman and Danyon Ebert-McQuillan.

Ebert died of an acute myocardial infarction on April 21, 2009. He was 76 years old.

Notes

All-American college baseball players
All-American college men's basketball players
Cornell University faculty
Duke University faculty
Ohio State Buckeyes baseball players
Ohio State Buckeyes men's basketball players
Milwaukee Hawks draft picks
American surgeons
1932 births
2009 deaths
Pan American Games medalists in baseball
Pan American Games silver medalists for the United States
American men's basketball players
Baseball players at the 1955 Pan American Games
Centers (basketball)
Forwards (basketball)
20th-century surgeons
Medalists at the 1955 Pan American Games
Members of the National Academy of Medicine